Purasawalkam is a neighbourhood in the northern region of Chennai, Tamil Nadu, India.

Purasawalkam may also refer to:

 Purasawalkam (state assembly constituency)
 Purasawalkam taluk